The 2023 UCLA men's volleyball team represents University of California, Los Angeles in the 2023 NCAA Division I & II men's volleyball season. The Bruins, led by eleventh year head coach John Speraw, play their home games at Pauley Pavilion and the John Wooden Center (when basketball has the use of Pauley Pavilion). The Bruins are members of the MPSF and were picked to finish first in the MPSF preseason poll.

Season highlights
 Ethan Champlin won the National Outside Attacker of the Week award for Week 0 games.

Roster

Schedule
TV/Internet Streaming information:
All home games will be televised on Pac-12 Network or Pac-12+. Most road games will also be streamed by the schools streaming service. The conference tournament will be streamed by FloVolleyball. 

 *-Indicates conference match. (#)-Indicates tournament seeding.
 Times listed are Pacific Time Zone. Rank – American Volleyball Coaches Association (AVCA) Men's Division I-II Coaches Poll. (#) Tournament seedings in parentheses.

Announcers for televised games

UC Santa Barbara: Max Kelton & Katie Spieler 
Princeton: Denny Cline
UC Santa Barbara: Denny Cline
UC San Diego: 
CSUN: 
George Mason: 
Ohio State: 
Penn State: 
Long Beach State: 
Long Beach State: 
BYU: 
BYU: Denny Cline
UC Irvine: 
UC Irvine: 
Concordia Irvine: 
Concordia Irvine: 
Hawai'i: ''
Stanford: 
Stanford: 
Grand Canyon: 
Grand Canyon: 
USC: 
USC: 
Pepperdine: 
Pepperdine: 
MPSF Tournament:

Rankings 

The media did not release a Pre-season or Week 1 poll.

Awards and honors
 Will be filled in as the season progresses.

References

2023 in sports in California
2023 NCAA Division I & II men's volleyball season
UCLA